List of Armenian Apostolic churches in Azerbaijan.

Baku 
 Church of the Holy Virgin (18th century) - destroyed 
 St. Gregory the Illuminator's Church (1887) - closed, used as a library

Dashkasan 
 Targmanchats Monastery (4-5th centuries) - ruin
 Church of the Holy Virgin, Chiragidzor - destroyed

Ganja 

 Church of St. Karapet (Middle Ages) - ruin 
 Church of St. John the Baptist (1633) - destroyed
 Church of the All-Savior (17th century) - destroyed; in its place is a medical college
 Church of Saint Sargis church (18th century) - destroyed
 Church of the Holy Mother of God (18th century) - destroyed
 Church of St. Thaddaeus (18th century - destroyed; in the place of the church is a cinema

Shaki
 Church of Kish

Nakhchivan Autonomous Republic 

A complete list of known Armenian Apostolic churches in Nakhichevan built since the adoption of Christianity in Armenia would include more than 280 churches.
Recent reports have alleged that probably all of the Armenian churches in Nakhchivan that were still standing in the decade before the collapse of the Soviet Union were destroyed by Azerbaijan in the aftermath of the Nagorno-Karabakh war. A 2006 report about a visit made to Nakhchivan in 2005 stated that of the five churches visited all were found to have been completely destroyed, in particular the 14th-century St. Karapet monastery in Abrakunis, and the 17th-century St. Hakop-Hayrapet church in Shurut. Azerbaijan has repeatedly barred on-site investigation of the condition of Armenian monuments in the region by outside groups.

Armenians divided the region into 5 gavars (regions): Goghtn, Yernjak, Nakhichevan, Chahuk-Shahaponq and Sharur.

Goghtn region
Number of known Armenian churches in Goghtn was 94.

Yernjak
Number of known Armenian churches in Ernjak was 68.

Nakhichevan
Number of known Armenian churches in Nakhichevan gavar was 34.

Chahuk-Shahaponq
Number of known Armenian churches in Chahuk-Shahaponq was 71.

Sharur
Number of known Armenian churches in Sharur was 17.

Qazakh 
 Saint Sargis Monastery of Gag - ruin

See also
 Armenian Apostolic Church

References

 Argam Ayvazyan: "Nakhijevan - The Patkeratzuytz (Map of Monuments)" , Yerevan 2007

 
Armenian
Oriental Orthodoxy-related lists